Elizabeth Susan Nelson VanLeeuwen ( Nelson; November 5, 1925 – November 27, 2022) was an American politician who was a member of the Oregon House of Representatives.

Early life and career 
VanLeeuwen was born in Lakeview, Oregon, where she lived until attending Oregon State University. She received a Bachelor of Science in Home Making Education and a minor in English in 1947. She married George VanLeeuwen on June 15, 1947 and was a farmer. She also was a news reporter and journalist for a newspaper in Brownsville, Oregon, from 1949 to 1970. She was a school teacher at Monroe High School, a substitute teacher and an adult educator in the 1950s and 1960s. She had a weekly farm report radio program on KWIL in the 1970s.

VanLeeuwen was a founding member of Oregon Women for Agriculture and a member of the Oregon Farm Bureau Women's Committee and Legislative Committee before being elected to the Oregon House of Representatives.

Political career 
VanLeeuwen served as a member of the Oregon House of Representatives from 1981 to 1999.

In 1999 she was elected to the Linn County Soil and Water Conservation board and held a position there.

In 2002 VanLeeuwen ran for Oregon's 4th congressional district against Peter DeFazio (D). She lost 64% to 34%.

Personal life and death 
VanLeeuwen and her husband George lived in Halsey, Oregon, and had four children. She died there on November 27, 2022, at the age of 97.

References

1925 births
2022 deaths
Republican Party members of the Oregon House of Representatives
People from Lakeview, Oregon
People from Halsey, Oregon
Oregon State University alumni
Journalists from Oregon
Women state legislators in Oregon
People from Brownsville, Oregon
21st-century American women